Anselmo de Moraes (born 20 February 1989), or simply Anselmo, is a Brazilian defensive midfielder who currently plays for Al-Wehda.

Career

Palmeiras
Anselmo made his debut for Palmeiras as a second-half substitute in a Campeonato Paulista 2010 match against Monte Azul on 27 January 2010. In 2011 goes on loan to the Campeonato Brasileiro Série B club Grêmio Barueri, while in 2012, is on loan to another Campeonato Brasileiro Série B club, São Caetano.

Italy
On 30 July 2012 he moved to the Serie A club Genoa for €900,000 in installments. Made his debut in Serie A on September 23 in the match won 1-0 over Lazio.
In January 2013 he was sold to Palermo in an exchange deal for right back Eros Pisano. Both clubs retained 50% registration rights, valued €700,000. Palermo relegated at the end of season. In June 2013 Genoa gave up the registration rights of Anselmo to Palermo, as well as acquired Pisano outright for €531,000. On 16 July 2013 Anselmo and Palermo mutually agreed to terminate the contract.

Palmeiras later sued Genoa to FIFA for unpaid €600,000 transfer fee. However Genoa still did not pay Palmeiras in time.

Return to Brazil
On 26 July 2013, he was re-signed by São Caetano in 2-year contract. On 14 August 2014, Joinville acquired 50% economic rights (as well as full registration rights) of Anselmo. In 2016, Anselmo joined Brasileiro Série A club Internacional on a three-year contract.

Honours
Joinville
Brazilian Série B: 2014

References

External links

1989 births
Living people
Brazilian footballers
Brazil under-20 international footballers
Brazilian expatriate footballers
Sociedade Esportiva Palmeiras players
Grêmio Barueri Futebol players
Associação Desportiva São Caetano players
Genoa C.F.C. players
Palermo F.C. players
Joinville Esporte Clube players
Sport Club Internacional players
Sport Club do Recife players
Al-Wehda Club (Mecca) players
Al Nassr FC players
Expatriate footballers in Italy
Campeonato Brasileiro Série A players
Campeonato Brasileiro Série B players
Serie A players
Saudi Professional League players
Association football midfielders
Brazilian expatriate sportspeople in Saudi Arabia
Expatriate footballers in Saudi Arabia
Footballers from São Paulo